Peter Bakowski (born 15 October 1954) is an Australian poet. His poems often use deceptively simple words and images, reminiscent at times of words in a child's picture book, but with some stylistic similarities to the work of writers such as Charles Simic or Vítězslav Nezval,

Biography 

Born in Melbourne, to Polish-German immigrants. Bakowski was born premature, with a hole in the heart; he has survived two heart operations. His parents ran a delicatessen, and after completing his secondary schooling he worked in a series of low-paying jobs before opening his own record shop in the early 1980s.

He commenced writing poetry while travelling through Texas in 1983. His early works, including his first book Thunder Road, Thunder Heart (1988), show the influence of American Beat writers such as Jack Kerouac, Allen Ginsberg and Charles Bukowski. His poems have appeared in over one hundred literary magazines worldwide, predominantly in English but also in Arabic, Bahasa-Indonesian, Bengali, German, Japanese, Polish, Spanish, Mandarin and French. He has lived in Melbourne and London, and travelled widely throughout Australia, Europe, North America and Africa, occasionally as an artist-in-residence. In 2007 he became an artist in residence at the University of Macau. He has been writer-in-residence at the B.R. Whiting Library in Rome; the Cité Internationale des Arts in Paris; the University of Macau; Soochow University, Jiangsu Province, China; the Katherine Susannah Prichard Writers' Centre in Greenmount, Western Australia; the Hobart Writers' Cottage in Battery Point, Tasmania; the Arthur Boyd Estate of "Bundanon" near Nowra, New South Wales; the Broken Hill Poetry Festival, New South Wales.

His travels have provided a wide range of material for his work; his fifth collection Days That We Couldn’t Rehearse contains poems set in Paris, Transylvania, the Upper Volga, Uzbekistan and Sarajevo.

Raised a Catholic, in 1994 he married Helen Bourke, an Irish-Australian seamstress. Their child, Ophelia Bakowski is a DJ, performance artist and photographer.

Bakowski's book In The Human Night won the 1996 Victorian Premier's Award, the C. J. Dennis Prize for Poetry. In 2010 he was shortlisted for the same award, for his book Beneath Our Armour.

In 2015, a bilingual book (French and English) of selected poems was published in France.
In June 2022, Peter Bakowski was Virtual Writer in Residence with the International Anthony Burgess Foundation via Manchester UNESCO City of Literature.

Bibliography 
 Thunder Road, Thunder Heart (Nosukumo Press, 1988)
 In The Human Night (Hale & Iremonger, 1995) 
 The Neon Hunger (Oel Press, 1996) 
 The Heart at 3am (Hale & Iremonger, 1997) 
 Days That We Couldn’t Rehearse (Hale & Iremonger, 2002) 
 Beneath Our Armour (Hunter Publishers, 2009) 
 Personal Weather (Hunter Publishers, 2014) 
 Le cœur à trois heures du matin (Editions Bruno Doucey, 2015) 
 The Courage Season (Guillotine Press, 2017) 
 The Elsewhere Variations (co-written with Ken Bolton) (Wakefield Press, 2019) 
 Wardrobe of Selves (Recent Work Press, 2019) 
 Nearly Lunch (co-written with Ken Bolton) (Wakefield Press, 2021) 
 Our Ways on Earth (Recent Work Press, 2022)

Awards 
 1996 Victorian Premier's Literary Awards: C. J. Dennis Prize for Poetry

References

External links 
 Peter Bakowski official site
  2011 ABC Radio National, Bakowski reading from Beneath Our Armour
  Interview conducted by Ralph Wessman, 2004
  Interview and book review of Beneath Our Armour, conducted by George Anderson, 2010
  Manchester UNESCO City of Literature Virtual Residency, 2022: Peter Bakowski
 

Australian people of Polish descent
Australian people of German descent
Poets from Melbourne
1954 births
Living people